Ibrahim Dervish Pasha (1817–1896) was a prominent Ottoman military figure and statesman during the 19th century.

References 

1817 births
1896 deaths
Political people from the Ottoman Empire
Ottoman Army generals